Sarah Mason (born 11 April 1995) is a New Zealand-born surfer currently residing in Australia.

On 11 April 2010 (her 15th birthday) Mason won the New Zealand Women's Open surfing title held off New Plymouth, New Zealand. She also gained wildcard entry to New Plymouth's ASP world championship Dream Tour event, held in the same month. On 15 April 2010 she beat world champion Stephanie Gilmore to make it to the quarter finals of the event. A day later she bet New Zealand No.1 Paige Hareb to advance to the semi finals, where she lost to Carissa Moore.

References

External links
Sarah Mason Official Facebook Site
Sarah Mason Official Website

1995 births
Living people
New Zealand surfers
New Zealand female surfers
World Surf League surfers
Sportspeople from Gisborne, New Zealand
Sportswomen from New South Wales
New Zealand expatriate sportspeople in Australia